Clearfly Communications (Greenfly Networks Inc. dba Clearfly Communications) is a provider of unified communications (UC) services for small-medium businesses in the United States. Founded in 2007, it managed to grow and expand in spite of adverse economic conditions. The company today manages thousands of customer sites in 48 of the 50 United States.

To reach and support their customers, Clearfly utilizes a network of active channel partners in the territory. These include some of the phone systems and network equipment resellers in each market.

Quality of service
Clearfly claims to owe its reputation for service quality to the way it manages a customer's connection end-to-end, enabling the company to enforce the most stringent Quality of Service parameters.

Fixed-to-mobile convergence
Clearfly was one of the first service providers to offer a CPE-based solution to seamless hand-off between cellular and Wi-Fi networks. The product enables mobile users to leverage their company's SIP Trunks whenever in proximity of an 802.11 Access Point. The CPE constantly monitors signal strength and other network parameters to determine the optimal access mode and routes the call accordingly and transparently to the end user. This results in better voice quality and savings on cellular airtime. Users can also dial and receive calls on their mobile handsets as if they were using their office desk-phone, which makes them more easily reachable and eliminates the need to publish separate mobile and fixed numbers.

References 

Telecommunications companies of the United States
VoIP companies of the United States
Internet service providers of the United States